The sovereign citizen movement (also SovCit movement or SovCits) is a loose grouping of litigants, activists, tax protesters, financial scheme promoters, and conspiracy theorists who claim to be answerable only to their particular interpretations of the common law and believe that they are therefore not subject to any government statutes or proceedings, unless they consent to them. The movement, which appeared in the early 1970s, is American in origin and exists primarily in the United States, though it has expanded to other countries. Notably, the freeman on the land movement, an offshoot of the sovereign citizen movement with similar doctrines, emerged during the 2000s in Canada before spreading to other Commonwealth countries. In the United States, the Federal Bureau of Investigation (FBI) describes sovereign citizens as "anti-government extremists who believe that even though they physically reside in this country, they are separate or 'sovereign' from the United States."

The sovereign citizen phenomenon is one of the main contemporary sources of pseudolaw: adherents to its ideology notably believe that courts have no actual jurisdiction over people and that the use of certain procedures (such as writing specific phrases on bills they do not want to pay) and loopholes can make one immune from government laws and regulations. They also regard most forms of taxation as illegitimate. Sovereign citizen arguments have no basis in law and have never been successful in court.

The movement may appeal to people facing financial or legal difficulties, or wishing to resist perceived government oppression, and looking for a mechanism that will solve their problems. As a result, it has grown significantly during times of economic or social crisis. Most schemes promoted by sovereign citizens involve means to avoid taxes, ignore laws, eliminate debts or extract money from the government.

American participants in the movement claim that the United States federal government is illegitimate. They argue the concept of individual sovereignty in opposition to the idea of "federal citizens", who, they say, have unknowingly forfeited their rights by accepting some aspect of federal law. Their foreign analogues hold similar beliefs about the government of their own countries. The movement can be traced back to American far-right groups like the Posse Comitatus and the constitutionalist wing of the militia movement. But while the sovereign citizen movement was originally associated with white supremacism and antisemitism, it now includes people of various ethnicities, most commonly Whites and African Americans. The latter sometimes belong to self-declared Moorish sects.

The majority of sovereign citizens are not violent and many will use pseudolegal tactics in attempts to ignore certain rules, to get out of debt, or to avoid such things as paying license fees and traffic tickets. However, the methods advocated by the movement are illegal and warrant prosecution; sovereign citizens notably adhere to the fraudulent schemes promoted by the redemption "A4V" movement. Many sovereign citizens have been found guilty of offenses such as tax evasion, hostile possession, forgery, threat against public officials, bank fraud or check fraud, as well as various degrees of traffic violations. Two of the most important crackdowns by U.S. authorities on sovereign citizen organizations have been the 1996 case of the Montana Freemen and the 2018 sentencing of "Judge" Bruce Doucette and his associates.

Also, because some have engaged in armed confrontations with law enforcement, the FBI classifies "sovereign citizen extremists" as domestic terrorists. Terry Nichols, one of the perpetrators of the 1995 Oklahoma City bombing, subscribed to a variation of sovereign citizen ideology. In surveys conducted in 2014 and 2015, representatives of U.S. law enforcement ranked the risk of terrorism from the sovereign citizen movement higher than the risk from any other group, including Islamic extremists, militias, racist skinheads, neo-Nazis and radical environmentalists. The New South Wales Police Force in Australia has also identified sovereign citizens as a potential terrorist threat.

History 

The sovereign citizen movement comes from the crossroads of the modern American tax protester phenomenon, of the radical and racist anti-government movements in the 1960s and 1970s, and of pseudolaw, which has existed in the United States since at least the 1950s. The belief in the illegitimacy of federal income tax gradually expanded to challenge the legitimacy of the government itself. The concept of a "sovereign citizen" whose rights are being unfairly denied originated in 1971 in the Posse Comitatus movement as a teaching of Christian Identity minister William Potter Gale: the early form of the movement was thus strongly associated with white supremacist and antisemitic ideologies. The Posse Comitatus was a far right anti-government movement that denounced the income tax, debt-based currency and debt collection as tools of Jewish control over the United States. After originating in that particular group, the sovereign citizen concept went on to influence the broader tax protester and Christian Patriot movements. The concepts of the redemption movement, which appeared within a successor organization of the Posse Comitatus, became a part of sovereign citizen ideology.

The sovereign citizen movement garnered more support during the American farm crisis of the late 1970s and 1980s and a financial crisis in both the U.S. and Canada during the same period. The 1980s farm crisis saw the rise of anti-government protesters selling fraudulent debt relief programs, some of whom were associated with far right groups. Those activists included Roger Elvick, who conceived the "redemption" methods. Later on, the advent of the Internet facilitated communications between people sharing the same ideas and helped the movement branch into other countries. One influential American "guru" who helped spread sovereign citizen ideology abroad was Winston Shrout, who held seminars in Canada (until he was prohibited from entering the country), Australia, New Zealand and the United Kingdom.

Over time, the movement expanded beyond its original white nationalist environment and appealed to people of all backgrounds. As of the 1990s, sovereign arguments have been adopted by minority groupings, notably the African American Moorish sovereigns, the movement's white supremacist origins notwithstanding. The Moorish sovereigns' beliefs derive, in part, from the Moorish Science Temple of America, which has condemned this sovereign citizen offshoot. Since the 1990s, the number of African American sovereign citizens has increased substantially. Various groups have appeared, some Islamic in nature, others adhering to New Age philosophies. Sovereign citizen ideas have also been adopted by some groups within the Hawaiian sovereignty movement. Sovereign citizen tactics have been used by members of various other fringe political or religious groups, such as black separatists or the Fundamentalist Church of Jesus Christ of Latter-Day Saints.

American pseudolaw matured around 1999–2000, and, at that point, was hosted by the sovereign citizen movement. Notably, the strawman theory was conceived around that time by Roger Elvick. During the same period, sovereign citizen ideology was introduced into Canada and then gradually into other countries.

Incidents such as the 1996 case of the Montana Freemen, the 2003 Abbeville standoff, the 2007 Edward and Elaine Brown standoff, the 2010 West Memphis police shootings, the 2014 Bundy standoff, the 2016 Malheur Refuge occupation (also involving the Bundy family), the 2016 Baton Rouge police shootings or the 2021 Wakefield standoff (involving African-American "Moorish" sovereign citizens) have attracted significant media attention in the United States.

Since the late 2000s, the sovereign citizen movement has significantly expanded in the United States, due to the Great Recession and more specifically to the mortgage crisis. In 2010, the Southern Poverty Law Center (SPLC) estimated that approximately 100,000 Americans were "hard-core sovereign believers", with another 200,000 "just starting out by testing sovereign techniques for resisting everything from speeding tickets to drug charges". According to another SPLC estimate, the number of sovereign citizen-influenced militia groups increased dramatically in the United States between 2008 and 2011, surging from 149 to 1,274. In Canada, sovereign citizen beliefs overlap with those of the local freeman on the land movement.

The COVID-19 pandemic has increased the spread of the movement in the United States and in other countries, as sovereign citizens have associated with anti-mask and anti-vaccine groupings and taken part in protests against sanitary measures. An increasing trend of sovereign citizens has notably been observed in Australia and in the United Kingdom during the pandemic. Several COVID-related incidents involving local sovereign citizens who refused to follow sanitary measures were also reported in Singapore. In June 2022, researcher Christine Sarteschi reported that the movement was rapidly expanding and could now be found in 26 countries.

There is overlap between the sovereign citizen and QAnon movements. A sovereign citizen group known as the Oath Enforcers attracted QAnon and Donald Trump supporters into the movement following the 2021 storming of the United States Capitol. In 2022, the Anti-Defamation League reported that the sovereign citizen movement was attracting a growing number of QAnon adherents, whose belief in the illegitimacy of the Biden administration is compatible with the sovereign citizens' broader anti-government views.

The behaviour of sovereign citizens during traffic stops, in courtrooms and in other public places is documented by many online videos that generally end in defeat for them. This has led some members of the public to consider sovereign citizens a source of amusement: Christine Sarteschi has commented that this may also cause people to underestimate the movement's potential for violence as well as its links with criminal conduct. Several people charged with crimes such as murder or sexual assault have used sovereign citizen arguments as attempts to negate the court's jurisdiction over them.

Hundreds, if not thousands, of sovereign citizens have been imprisoned as a result of their actions. Many have continued their activities behind bars, often spreading their ideologies among other inmates.

Theories 

 

The movement has no defining text, established doctrine or centralized leadership. There are, however, common themes, generally implying that the legitimate government and legal system have been somehow replaced and that the current authorities are devoid of legitimacy. Taxes and licenses are likewise thought to be illegitimate. A number of leaders, commonly referred to as "gurus", develop their own variations. The movement's theories include numerous influences from a variety of sources, some of them decades old, resulting in a narrative of American history that is often confusing and incoherent.

Sovereign citizens' legal theories reinterpret the Constitution of the United States through selective reading of law dictionaries (notably an obsolete version of Black's Law Dictionary), state court opinions, or specific capitalization, and incorporate other details from a variety of sources including the Uniform Commercial Code, the Articles of Confederation, the Magna Carta, the Bible, and foreign treaties. They ignore the second clause of Article VI of the Constitution (the Supremacy Clause), which establishes the Constitution as the law of the land and the United States Supreme Court as the ultimate authority to interpret it. Most consider that the county sheriff is the most powerful law enforcement officer in the country, with authority superior to that of any federal agent, elected official, or local law enforcement official.

Not all sovereign citizens will call themselves as such, and some movement members actually regard the term "sovereign citizen" as an oxymoron. Sovereign citizens may prefer to label themselves as individuals "seeking the Truth" or "living on the land", or use other denominations such as "state national", "natural person", "constitutionalists", "freemen", "natural people", "living people" or "private person".

Illegitimacy of laws and government

A widespread belief among sovereign citizens is that the state is not an actual government, but a "corporation": American movement members consider that the corporation purporting to be the U.S. federal government is illegally controlling the republic via a territorial government in Washington, DC. Some sovereign citizens also believe that the United States "corporation" is bankrupt. As a result, the illegitimate U.S. government is said to secretly use its citizens as collateral against foreign debt, effectively enslaving Americans. Sovereign citizens believe that this sale of American citizens takes place at the birth of each American baby, through issuing their birth certificate and attributing their Social Security number.

Sovereign citizens believe that when the government set up by the Founding Fathers under a common law legal system was secretly replaced, "commercial law" substituted for common law. This commercial law is generally understood to be admiralty law, as sovereign citizens consider that the current, illegitimate, law is based on principles of international commerce. This leads sovereign citizens to believe that U.S. judges and lawyers are actually agents of a foreign power. Sovereign citizens also claim that the appearance of gold fringes on American flags that are displayed in courtrooms is evidence of admiralty law being in effect. Sovereign citizens will therefore challenge the validity of the contemporary legal system and claim to answer only to "God's law" or to "common law", meaning by that the system which supposedly existed before the conspiracy.

There is no consensus among sovereign citizens as to when the secret change of political and legal system took place; some believe it occurred during the Civil War, while others date it to 1933, when the United States abandoned the gold standard (which is often believed to be the cause of the country's bankruptcy). According to one version, the vehicle for the change was the District of Columbia Organic Act of 1871, which sovereign citizens believe created a "United States corporation" to govern the District of Columbia under commercial code; this form of corporate rule then extended to the entire country. Another theory has it that the country was secretly reorganized as a post office in 1789; pseudolegal schemes attribute a particular power to the Universal Postal Union and to the use of postage stamps on legal documents.

The beliefs that the current government is a "corporation" and that people are secretly under a form of commercial law leads sovereign citizens to consider that statutory law is a contract binding people to the state. According to this theory, people are tricked into said "contract" through various things including Social Security numbers, fishing licenses, or ZIP Codes, and avoiding their use means immunity from government authority. Another common belief among sovereign citizens is that they can opt out of the purported contract – hence making themselves immune from the laws they do not wish to abide by – by declining to "consent": when confronted by police officers or other officials, sovereign citizens will typically attempt to negate their authority by stating "I do not consent".

Many sovereign citizens believe that the Uniform Commercial Code, which provides an interstate standard for such things as property ownership or bank accounts (and documents that they believe apply only to their "strawman", such as drivers' licenses), is a codification of the illegitimate commercial law ruling the United States. Therefore, they consider that exploiting supposed loopholes in the UCC will help them assert their rights, or invoke their special privileges and powers as "common law citizens".

The unpassed Titles of Nobility Amendment has been invoked to challenge the legitimacy of the courts as lawyers sometimes use the informal title of esquire.

The belief that the current legal system is illegitimate has impelled some sovereign citizens to consider themselves as "above the law" and to commit actual crimes.

Citizenship

American sovereign citizens posit that contemporary United States citizenship is somehow defective or fraudulent, and that it curtails citizens' legitimate rights. Some sovereign citizens also claim that they can become immune to most or all laws of the United States by renouncing citizenship in a "federal corporation" and declaring only to be a citizen of the state where they reside: this process, which they refer to as "expatriation", involves filing or delivering a nonlegal document claiming their renunciation of citizenship to any county clerk's office that can be convinced to accept it.

In the 1970s, one of the movement's originators, white supremacist ideologue William Potter Gale, identified the Fourteenth Amendment to the United States Constitution as the act that converted "sovereign citizens" into "federal citizens" by their agreement to a contract to accept benefits from the federal government. Other commentators have identified other acts, including the Uniform Commercial Code, the Emergency Banking Act, the Zone Improvement Plan, and the alleged suppression of the Titles of Nobility Amendment.

Likewise, sovereign citizen leader Richard McDonald claimed that there are two classes of citizens in America: the "original citizens of the states" (also called "States citizens", or "Organic citizens") and "U.S. citizens". According to McDonald, U.S. citizens – whom he calls "Fourteenth Amendment citizens" – have civil rights, legislated to give the freed black slaves after the Civil War rights comparable to the unalienable constitutional rights of white state citizens: the benefits of U.S. citizenship are received by consent in exchange for freedom. In this perspective, state citizens must consequently take steps to revoke and rescind their U.S. citizenship and reassert their de jure common-law state citizen status. This involves removing one's self from federal jurisdiction and relinquishing any evidence of consent to U.S. citizenship, such as a Social Security number, driver's license, car registration, use of ZIP Codes, marriage license, voter registration, and birth certificate. Also included is the refusal to pay state and federal income taxes because citizens not under U.S. jurisdiction are not required to pay them.

Sovereign citizens may claim that their status in the United States is that of "non-resident aliens". Only residents (resident aliens) of the states, not its citizens, are income-taxable, sovereign citizens argue. And as a state citizen landowner, one can bring forward the original land patent and file it with the county for absolute or allodial property rights. Such allodial ownership is held "without recognizing any superior to whom any duty is due on account thereof" (Black's Law Dictionary). Superiors include those who levy property taxes or who hold mortgages or liens against the property.

The concept of "14th Amendment citizens" is consistent with the movement's white supremacist origins in that it can cause adherents to believe that African Americans, having only become legal citizens after the Civil War, have far fewer rights than Whites, or that only Black people have to pay federal taxes and abide by federal laws.

On the contrary, "Moorish" sovereign citizens consider that African Americans constitute an elite class within American society, with special rights and privileges that make them immune from federal and state authority. They will commonly adopt "Africanized" version of their names by adding "el" or "Bey" or a combination of the two, and associate themselves with a particular "Moorish" group, claiming that they are not culpable for acts committed under their previous name and that their affiliation makes them immune from prosecution. The underpinnings of the theories of African American exemption vary. One belief is that the "Moors" were America's original inhabitants and are therefore entitled to be self-governing. They claim to be descendants of the Moroccan "Moors" and to be thus subject to the 1786 Moroccan-American Treaty of Friendship, which they believe gives them exemption from American law. A variation of "Moorish" ideology is found in the Washitaw Nation, which claims rights through provisions in the Louisiana Purchase treaty granting privileges to Moors as early colonists and the non-existent "United Nations Indigenous People's Seat 215". Various other sovereign citizen groups claim special status and exemption from their countries' laws by purporting to belong to real or imaginary ethnic minorities.

Dual personas

One recurring idea in sovereign citizen ideology is that individuals have two personas, one of flesh and blood and the other a separate, secret, legal personality (commonly called the "strawman"), created upon each person's birth, that is subject to the government. Sovereign citizens claim that it is possible to dissociate oneself from the "strawman" through the use of certain procedures, thus becoming free of all debts, liabilities and legal constraints.

Economics

Sovereign citizen texts often posit that "international bankers" are at the source of the conspiracy that replaced the United States' legitimate government and legal system. In the movement's earlier form, these bankers were explicitly stated to be Jews. While this can still be implied in sovereign citizen literature, the movement's original antisemitic conspiracy theories were diluted over time; most contemporary sovereign citizens tend to present greatly simplified versions of these theories, without any mentions of Jewish conspiracies and with only vague references to the role of corrupt bankers.

The sovereign citizen movement overlaps with the redemption movement (also known as "A4V" after one of its schemes), which claims that a secret bank account is created for every citizen at birth as part of the process used by the U.S. government to sell its citizens into slavery and use them as collateral, as a result of the country's secret bankruptcy. "Redemption" theories assert that the vast sums of money contained by this account can be reclaimed through certain procedures, and applied to financial obligations or even criminal charges. Several prominent sovereign citizens have advocated redemption schemes. The belief in a secret bank account is intertwined with the strawman theory, since this fund is supposedly associated with the strawman.

Pseudolegal economic theories also imply various misconceptions about currencies and financial institutions, one being that banks "create money from thin air" so a borrower has no obligation to pay them back, and another that money is actually worthless when not backed by gold. Many sovereign citizens do not recognize U.S. currency and demand to receive their money in the form of gold or silver coins.

Some sovereign citizens also subscribe to the NESARA-related conspiracy theory.

Freedom of movement

Using arguments that rely on exacting definitions and word choice, sovereign citizens may assert a constitutional "right to travel" in a "conveyance", distinguishing it from driving an automobile in order to justify ignoring requirements for license plates, vehicle registration, insurances and driver's licenses. The right to travel is claimed based on a variety of passages, some being more commonly used among groups. One common argument from sovereign citizens is that they are "traveling" and not "driving" because they are not transporting commercial goods or paying passengers.

Other

Other pseudolegal theories commonly shared by sovereign citizens include that "silence means consent" for any sort of documents, that any claim or alleged statement of fact placed in a sworn document (known in pseudolegal jargon as an "affidavit of truth") is proven true unless rebutted, and that there is no crime if there is no injured party.

Some sovereign citizens are involved in other forms of conspiracy theories, including QAnon. Certain subgroups within the movement adhere to theories about extraterrestrials and reptilians. One advocate of sovereign citizen fraudulent tax avoidance schemes, Sean David Morton, was also active as a psychic and ufologist. In Québec, sovereign citizen ideology has been promoted by anti-vaccine activist and AIDS denialist Guylaine Lanctôt.

In 2022, the Anti-Defamation League reported that sovereign citizen ideology was "increasingly seeping" into QAnon, as the movement's anti-government views were compatible with QAnon's belief in a worldwide "cabal" and in the illegitimacy of the Biden administration.

Several groups, notably that led by "guru" David Straight, have been convincing parents whose children were removed from their custody that Child Protective Services are engaged in child trafficking, and encouraging them to kidnap their children.

One American sovereign citizen "guru" and "quantum grammar" advocate, Russell Jay Gould, claims that having filed a document pursuant to the U.S. flag at a moment when the United States was supposedly bankrupt makes him the legitimate ruler of the country. Another American guru, Heather Ann Tucci-Jarraf, claimed before her sentencing for fraud to have "foreclosed" and "cancelled" all banks and governments through UCC filings. Likewise, Romana Didulo, a Canadian QAnon conspiracy theorist, uses sovereign citizen concepts to back her claims of being the rightful Queen of Canada, and eventually the "Queen of the World".

Tactics 

Sovereign citizens may be affiliated to a group within the movement, follow the teachings of a specific "guru", or act entirely on their own. By disobeying rules they consider to be illegitimate, they regularly find themselves in conflict with all forms of government institutions, most commonly law enforcement, the judiciary and the revenue services. One sovereign citizen from Montana, Ernie Wayne terTelgte, became a local celebrity by engaging in 2013 in a protracted legal battle with authorities over the need to have a fishing license and then having multiple incidents with law enforcement over this matter or over his lack of a driver's license.

Sovereign citizens often use irregular documents and flawed or invented legal arguments as "proof" of their claims. Pseudolegal documents, including those purporting to assert one's "sovereignty" thus making him immune from his country's law, may be sold by sovereign citizen groups for monetary gain. It is common for sovereign citizen "gurus" to earn money by selling to followers of the movement standard documents such as template filings, scripts to recite at court appearances, or other "quick-fix" solutions to legal problems. Some "gurus" sell "how-to" manuals explaining the movement's theories and schemes: one such manual is Title 4 Flag Says You're Schwag: The Sovereign Citizen's Handbook, which has been reprinted and updated several times.

Sovereign citizens will use an unusual vocabulary and twist the meaning of legal terms, or even commonplace phrases, according to their own convenience. This includes avoiding the use of expressions they think would make them enter into a "contract" with the government: for example, when dealing with the police, sovereign citizens will often avoid saying "I understand" and will say instead "I comprehend", as they believe that the word "understand" acknowledges that one "stand[s] under the jurisdiction", thus recognizing the police's authority.

Sovereign citizens' conflicts with authorities have occasionally resulted in violence.

Traffic law violations
Sovereign citizens consistently violate traffic laws by refusing to use driver's licenses and valid license plates, and to register or insure their vehicles. Some use homemade license plates and bumper stickers, which can serve the unintended purpose of warning police officers that they are dealing with a sovereign citizen. Most interactions of sovereign citizens with law enforcement actually take place on the road: as a result, the general public is mostly familiar with the movement through online videos of sovereign citizens' confrontations with traffic officers.

Anti-tax and other financial schemes

Many sovereign citizens engage in various forms of tax resistance, causing disputes with government administrations. It is estimated that in the United States, sovereign citizens and other tax protesters have caused about $1 billion in public losses from 1990 to 2013.

Sovereign citizens use a variety of fraudulent schemes, including filing false securities, to avoid paying taxes, to get "refunds" from the government, or to eliminate their debts and mortgages. The belief that money is worthless since the abandonment of the Gold standard has led sovereign citizens to create fictitious financial instruments. One of the first to use this method, in the 1980s, was tax protester and songwriter Tupper Saussy, who created check-like instruments which he called "Public Money Office Certificates". While Saussy issued these "certificates" primarily as a form of protest, sovereign citizens have been using false "promissory notes", "bills of exchange", "coupons", "bonds" or "sight drafts" to pay taxes, purchase properties or fight foreclosures. Some "gurus" have scammed adherents to the movement by selling them such counterfeit instruments.

Sovereign citizens may use the ineffective methods advocated by the redemption movement for appropriating the sums from one's purported secret Treasury account: such schemes are sometimes called "money for nothing". For example, writing "Accepted for Value" or "Taken for Value" on bills or collection letters will supposedly cause them to be paid with the "strawman"'s secret fund (this scheme is commonly known as "A4V"). Purported methods for claiming the secret fund include filing a UCC-1 financing statement against one's strawman after "separating" from it.

Pseudolegal tactics

Sovereign citizen documents may include unusual formalities, such as Latin maxims, thumbprints, or stamps in certain places, as well as unconventional, sometimes incomprehensible legalese. Stamps are generally accompanied by signatures (with the sovereign citizen's name signed across them), initials or other markings. Signatures and thumbprints are likely to be in red ink or blood, since black and blue inks are believed to indicate corporations. As bonds are canceled using red ink in some U.S. states, sovereign citizens may sign in red ink to signify that they are canceling the bond attached to their birth certificate or to their "strawman". Others use red ink because it represents the blood of the "flesh-and-blood person". Other methods to dissociate oneself from the "strawman" include unusual spelling and writing one's name in a different manner or with punctuation, i.e. "John of the family Doe" instead of "John Doe" or "John-Robert: Doe" instead of "John Robert Doe".

Sovereign citizens will often add the Latin phrase sui juris (meaning "of one's own right") to their names on legal documents, to signify that they are reserving all the rights to which they are entitled as a free person.

Postage stamps are supposed to make pseudolegal documents authoritative, but their meaning varies depending on the "guru". One version has it that stamps grant sovereignty to pseudolaw affiliates: their use on documents purportedly makes one a "postmaster" with equal rights and peer status to nation states.

When signing an official document such as a drivers' license, a mortgage document, or a traffic ticket, sovereign citizens will often add under threat, duress and coercion (or a variation thereof, such as the initials TDC) after or under their name: that phrase implies that they are not voluntarily signing the document, which purportedly helps them avoid entering into a "contract" with the illegitimate government and falling under its jurisdiction. Some may write TDC after their ZIP codes.

Cases involving sovereign citizens can cause severe problems to law enforcement officers and court officials. Sovereign citizens may challenge the laws, rules or sentences they disagree with by engaging in the practice known as paper terrorism, which involves filing complaints with legal documents that may be bogus or simply misused. Minor issues such as traffic violations or disagreements over pet-licensing fees may provoke numerous court filings. Courts will then find themselves burdened with having to process hundreds of pages of irregular, pseudolegal documents, causing a strain on their resources.

In May 2019, Kim Blandino, a felon residing in Nevada, was found guilty of traffic offenses. He then threatened the judge who had presided over his hearing to file complaints against him, and demanded a monetary "settlement" from him. Blandino was charged with extortion and impersonation of an officer: he then filed numerous motions to delay the proceedings, and tried to disqualify almost every judge in the district. Blandino's motions required multiple reviews and countless hours of hearings. As a result, the case had not yet reached a final disposition by March 2022.

When involved in court cases, sovereign citizens will generally act as their own lawyers, though on some occasions a sovereign citizen "leader" may assist them in court. They often use uncommon or downright disconcerting pseudolegal tactics. People and groups linked to the movement have been using a constructed language created by American theorist David Wynn Miller, who asserted that this unorthodox version of the English language, variously called "Parse-Syntax-Grammar", "Correct-Language", "Truth Language" or "Quantum Grammar", guarantees success in legal proceedings where it constitutes the only "correct" form of communication.

As they regard themselves as bound only by their own interpretation of common law, sovereign citizens have been setting up militias of self-appointed "sheriffs", as well as "common law courts", to handle matters regarding movement members. These "courts", which are devoid of legal authority, are frequently used to formalize the "declarations of sovereignty" of movement members, in a process often known as "asseveration".

False liens and other harassment tactics

Besides paper terrorism, sovereign citizens have used various techniques of intimidation and harassment to achieve their goals. One method of retaliation used by sovereign citizens against public officials, or against other real or perceived enemies, is the filing of false liens. Anyone can file a notice of lien against property such as real estate, vehicles, or other assets of another under the Uniform Commercial Code and other laws. In most states of the United States, the validity of liens is not investigated or inquired into at the time of filing. Notices of liens (whether legally valid or not) are a cloud on the title of the property and may affect the property owner's credit rating, ability to obtain home equity loans, refinance the property or take other action with regards to the property. Clearing up fraudulent notices of liens may be expensive and time-consuming.

Illegitimate sovereign citizen common law courts are also used to put enemies on trial: on occasion, public officials have been tried in absentia by sovereign citizens and sentenced to death for treason.

Another tactic used by sovereign citizens involves false arbitration entities operated by movement members, that will issue unilaterally, on behalf of their clients, "rulings" ordering the client's creditors or other victims to pay large sums of money in damages. In 2022, the Anti-Defamation League reported that although this particular tactic seems to have appeared around 2014, its use had intensified since 2019. According to the ADL's report, these sham rulings are designed, besides targeting specific victims, to clog the court system that sovereign citizens consider to be illegitimate.

Some sovereign citizens have advocated and practiced adverse possession of properties. Notably, Moorish Sovereigns have cited reparations as a justification for squatting homes and claiming other people's properties as their own, even though they also targeted the possessions of other African Americans.

In the United States, some people involved in First Amendment audits have been identified as sovereign citizens by authorities.

Legal status of theories 
Sovereign citizens' tactics often succeed in delaying legal proceedings, and may occasionally confuse or exhaust public officials. However, their arguments are never upheld in court. Their claims have been consistently rejected by courts in various countries, including the United States, Canada, Australia and New Zealand. Mark Pitcavage, a researcher working for the Anti-Defamation League's Center on Extremism, has summed up sovereign citizen ideology as "magical thinking". One state representative from New Hampshire, Richard Marple, repeatedly tried to introduce legislation that would recognize sovereign citizen ideas, though without success.

One crucial flaw of pseudolegal theories in general is that the "common law" they cite is based not on historical precedent but instead on an erroneous perception of traditional English law.

In 2012, the Court of Queen's Bench of Alberta's Meads v. Meads decision, pertaining to a contentious divorce case in which the husband used freeman on the land arguments, compiled a decade of Canadian jurisprudence and American academic research about pseudolaw. It went much further than the matters of the case by covering various arguments and tactics commonly used by the freeman on the land, redemption and sovereign citizen movements, and refuting them in detail. Meads v. Meads, written by Associate Chief Justice John D. Rooke, has since been used as case law by courts in Canada and in other Commonwealth countries.

Immunity from laws and taxes

Pseudolegal documents and arguments claiming that one is personally immune from jurisdiction or should not be paying taxes have never been accepted by any court. In 1990, after Andrew Schneider was convicted and sentenced to five years in prison for making a threat by mail, he argued that he was a free, sovereign citizen and therefore was not subject to the jurisdiction of the federal courts. That argument was rejected by the United States Court of Appeals for the Seventh Circuit as having "no conceivable validity in American law".

The belief that legal obligations are contracts that can be opted out fails to acknowledge that government and court authority is not a product of one's consent, and that the relationship between the state and an individual is not based on a contract. The Canadian decision Meads v. Meads refuted the theory that laws are contracts, commenting that:

The conception that one can avoid paying taxes in the country he physically resides in by renouncing or challenging the validity of his citizenship and by claiming to be a "non-resident alien" is legally baseless. The Internal Revenue Service has refuted in detail "frivolous tax arguments" such as this and the idea that filing tax returns and paying Federal Income tax are "voluntary".

In a criminal case in 2013, the United States District Court for the Western District of Washington noted:

Leaming was found guilty of three counts of retaliating against a federal judge or law enforcement officer by a false claim, one count of concealing a person from arrest, and one count of being a felon in possession of a firearm. On May 24, 2013, Leaming was sentenced to eight years in federal prison.

In 2017, former Subway spokesman Jared Fogle, with the help of another inmate, filed two motions aimed at overturning his convictions on child sex tourism and child pornography charges on the basis of his status as a sovereign citizen on whom the court had no jurisdiction. The court dismissed the motions, commenting that Fogle's arguments had "no conceivable validity in American law" and that "the Seventh Circuit has rejected theories of individual sovereignty, immunity from prosecution, and their ilk".

The sovereign citizen concept that courts in the United States are secretly admiralty courts and thus have no jurisdiction over people has been repeatedly dismissed as frivolous.

Author Richard Abanes considers that sovereign citizens fail to sufficiently examine the context of the case laws they cite, and ignore adverse evidence, such as Federalist No. 15, wherein Alexander Hamilton expressed the view that the Constitution placed everyone personally under federal authority.

Strawman theory and redemption schemes
The strawman theory has been repeatedly dismissed by courts. In 2021, the District Court of Queensland dismissed an application that relied on this theory, commenting that "the so called 'straw man' argument may properly be described as nonsense or gobbledygook". The FBI considers anyone promoting it a likely fraudster.

Meads v. Meads addressed the strawman theory, stating that

The theory of a secret fund associated with the strawman is considered a scam; the schemes advocated by the redemption movement amount to fraud. Redemption methods such as "Accepted for Value" are based on a misinterpretation of the Uniform Commercial Code and have no effect.

Creating and selling fictitious financial instruments is likewise a scam. People who purchased sovereign citizen instruments purported to help them pay off their debts or avoid foreclosures have worsened their situation by doing so.

Traffic
Sovereign citizens' argument that they do not need driver's licenses, license plates and vehicle insurances has never been upheld in court. One common response to this claim from U.S. law enforcement is that, while anyone is free to "travel" by foot, by bike or even by horse, operating a motor vehicle is a complex activity that requires training and licensure. Several United States Supreme Court rulings state that drivers' licenses and traffic regulations are necessary for public safety.

Other arguments and schemes

The claim that the District of Columbia Organic Act of 1871 turned the United States into a business corporation is based on a misunderstanding of the term municipal corporation used in the Act (which referred to the District of Columbia and not to the entire country) and on a misinterpretation of a provision in Title 28 of the United States Code, which includes a definition of the United States as a "federal corporation" (meaning a group authorized to legally act as a single entity and not a business corporation).

The theories that "silence means consent" and that an unrebutted affidavit stands as truth are based on misinterpretations of the legal maxim "He who does not deny, admits".

The idea that "there is no crime if there is no injured party" is based on a misinterpretation of tort law and fails to recognize the existence of different levels of legal violations.

Filing fraudulent notices of liens or documents is a crime in the United States.

American courts have routinely dismissed documents written in David Wynn Miller's "Parse-Syntax-Grammar"/"Quantum Grammar" language, calling them unintelligible. Canadian judge John D. Rooke commented, in his Meads v. Meads decision, that Miller's "bizarre form of 'legal grammar is "not merely incomprehensible in Canada, but equally so in any other jurisdiction".

The Universal Postal Union, which is often invoked as a supranational authority in sovereign citizen schemes, has officially denied that it has "the authority to confer official recognition" upon sovereign citizens, "or to grant some kind of formal status to such individuals", also specifying that "the use of postage stamps on legal documents does not create an opportunity or obligation for the UPU to become involved in those matters".

Sovereign citizens' "common law courts" are devoid of any legal standing. Some may be simply ignored by authorities: in 2015, sovereign citizen "guru" Anna Maria Riezinger aka Anna von Reitz, the self-proclaimed "judge" of a common law court in Alaska, published a letter calling for federal agents to arrest President Barack Obama, the entire Congress and the Secretary of the Treasury, causing a minor Internet rumor. Snopes debunked her claim by establishing that von Reitz was not a real judge, and that her "orders" therefore had no force. However, depending on the nature and severity of their actions, sovereign citizen "courts" may be disbanded and their leaders prosecuted. In 2018, upon sentencing sovereign citizen "Judge" Bruce Doucette to 38 years in prison, Colorado's 18th Judicial District likened his network of "common law courts" to a racketeering enterprise equivalent to organized crime.

Responses from U.S. authorities

Government and law enforcement responses
Following the 1995 Oklahoma City bombing, of which one perpetrator adhered to sovereign citizen ideology, federal law enforcement began cracking down on white supremacist groups. One highly publicized incident was the 1996 Montana Freemen standoff; the Montana Freemen were Christian Patriot sovereign citizens and direct ideological descendants of the Posse Comitatus. The bombing also led Congress to pass the Antiterrorism and Effective Death Penalty Act of 1996, enhancing sentences for certain terrorism-related offenses.

As of the 1990s, several hundreds of people involved in "common law courts" operated by sovereign citizens or, more broadly, by the Patriot movement have been arrested for crimes such as fraud, faking legal processes, impersonating, intimidating or threatening officials, or even in some cases violent attacks. In 1998, a number of states passed legislations outlawing the activities of these "courts" or strengthening existing sanctions.

Following incidents like the 2010 West Memphis police shootings, U.S. law enforcement agencies have provided advice to officers on how to deal with sovereign citizens at traffic stops and elsewhere.

In October 2015, during a domestic terrorism seminar at George Washington University, National Security Division leader and Assistant Attorney General John P. Carlin stated that the Obama Administration had witnessed "anti-government views triggering violence throughout America". Carlin personally confirmed the 2014 START survey findings, saying that during his time at the FBI and DOJ, law enforcement officials had identified sovereign citizens as their top concern. Carlin referred to social media as a "radicalization echo chamber" through which domestic extremists deliver, re-appropriate, and reinforce messages of hate, propaganda, and calls to recruitment and violence. He charged its service providers with the responsibility of tracking and taking action against, any such abuse of its services.

Judicial responses 

To prevent their courts from being burdened by frivolous litigation, some states have heightened penalties inflicted upon people who file baseless motions. Some courts choose to impose pre-filing injunctions against certain pro se serial litigants, in order to preclude them from filing new lawsuits or documents without prior leave.

Roger Elvick, the originator of the redemption movement, was convicted in 1991 in Hawaii of passing more than $1 million in false sight drafts, and of filing fraudulent IRS forms. He was sentenced to five years in federal prison. Upon his release, Elvick resumed his activities, conceiving the strawman theory at that point. In 2003, he was indicted in Ohio on multiple felony counts. During preliminary hearings, Elvick disrupted proceedings with sovereign citizen arguments, denying his identity and claiming that the court had no jurisdiction over him or his "strawman". A judge ruled Elvick mentally unfit to stand trial and committed him to a correctional psychiatric facility. After nine months of treatment, Elvick stood trial and pleaded guilty; in April 2005, he was sentenced to four years in prison.

When he faced tax evasion charges in 2006, actor Wesley Snipes adopted a sovereign citizen line of defense by claiming to be a "non-resident alien" who should not be subject to income tax. He was eventually found guilty on three misdemeanor counts of failing to file federal income tax returns and sentenced to 36 months in prison.

From 1994 to 2002, James S. Kalfsbeek and Donna Jean Rowe, two sovereign citizens from California, operated a false automobile insurance company outside of state insurance regulatory authorities. The company, which was active in the United States and Canada, collected millions of dollars in fees while leaving its clients without an adequate coverage and attempting to pay some damages with false bills of exchange. In 2010, Kalfsbeek and Rowe were respectively sentenced to ten and four years in prison.

In 2011, after the Giordano's pizzeria chain entered bankruptcy, its owner John Apostolou challenged the proceedings by filing documents that had been prepared by a sovereign citizen guru. The bankruptcy court barred Apostolou from entering the company's headquarters and from patronizing its restaurants.

Psychic Sean David Morton spent several years promoting sovereign citizen schemes purported to "wipe out" taxes, mortgages and loans. He eventually managed to get for himself an illegitimate $480,322.55 tax refund due to a mistake by the Internal Revenue Service. Morton was charged with tax fraud and civil securities fraud. In 2017, he was sentenced to six years in prison and to return the money to the IRS. His wife and associate was also sentenced to prison.

During the 2010s, computer repair shop owner Bruce Doucette, who styled himself as "Superior Court Judge of the Continental uNited States of America" and led a group called "The People's Grand Jury in Colorado", traveled the country to help other sovereign citizens fight local governments and set up their own "common law courts". He was involved in the 2016 Malheur refuge occupation. Doucette and his followers attempted to intimidate sheriffs, prosecutors, judges, and county officials so they would dismiss criminal cases against other sovereign citizens. When these efforts failed, Doucette and his group retaliated against the public officials by engaging in paper terrorism against them with false subpoenas, arrest warrants and property liens, threatening them with "arrest" by their self-appointed "Marshals". Doucette and a number of his associates were arrested in 2017 and charged with multiple felony counts. In May 2018, Doucette was found guilty of participating in a racketeering enterprise, retaliation against several judges and attempting to influence a public servant. He was sentenced to 38 years in prison. Two of his co-defendants were sentenced to 36 and 22 years, respectively. Colorado prosecutors commented that through this verdict, they wished to send a message nationally to sovereign citizens and remind them that threats against local government officials would not be tolerated.

Heather Ann Tucci-Jarraf, a licensed lawyer who had been at one point a state prosecutor, eventually joined the sovereign citizen movement: she built an online following as a "guru" and advocated the use of redemption methods to reclaim one's alleged secret fund from the banking system and the Federal Reserve. One of her followers, Randall Beane, used Internet fraud to embezzle two millions of dollars from a bank; Tucci-Jarraf was aware of Beane's scheme and advised him throughout. Beane and Tucci-Jarraf were arrested in July 2017 and charged with federal crimes. In January 2018, they were both found guilty of conspiracy to launder money, with Beane also being convicted of wire and bank fraud. The court ruled that Tucci-Jarraf having used her legal training to assist Beane was an aggravating circumstance. Beane was sentenced to 155 months in prison, and Tucci-Jarraf to 57 months.

In 2018, Leighton Ward, an associate of David Wynn Miller who used forged documents as part of a mortgage elimination scheme based on the use of Miller's language, was sentenced in Arizona to 23 1/2 years in prison for fraudulent schemes and artifices, forgery, theft and recording of false documents.

Winston Shrout, an influential sovereign citizen "guru" based in Oregon, advocated tax resistance and redemption/A4V schemes for twenty years. During that time, he did not file any tax returns, issued hundreds of fake "Bills of exchange" for himself and others, and eventually mailed to a bank one quadrillion dollars in counterfeit securities supposedly to be honored by the Treasury. Shrout was charged in 2016 with 13 counts of using fic­ti­tious finan­cial instru­ments. In 2017, he was found guilty of several counts of tax evasion and producing fictitious financial instruments. The next year, he was sentenced to 10 years in prison. Several of Shrout's followers who had tested his ideas, including his daughter, were also sentenced.

Randal Rosado, a Florida resident who subscribed to a form of sovereign citizen ideology, started in 2006 giving unlicensed legal advice against foreclosures. He eventually created a series of false legal entities, including an "International Court of Commerce", and used them to file fictitious arrest warrants, court orders and liens against public officials and lawyers, most of whom had been involved in foreclosures. Rosado was arrested in 2016. In September 2019, he was sentenced to 40 years in prison on numerous counts of unlawful retaliation against public officials and of simulating the legal process.

Timothy Jermaine Pate AKA Akenaten Ali, a "Moorish" sovereign citizen from Georgia, filed false tax returns claiming millions of dollars and, after this scheme failed, retaliated by filing multi-million dollar liens against government officials, attempting to put them into involuntary bankruptcy. In January 2020, Pate was sentenced to 25 years in prison. This was one of the longest federal sentences ever handed out for a false retaliatory lien case.

In 2021, Pauline Bauer, a Pennsylvania restaurant owner who was facing low-level charges for her participation in the Capitol riot, used a sovereign citizen line of defense by claiming to be a ""self-governed individual" and a "Free Living Soul" and to be thus immune from prosecution. She was jailed for one day for contempt of court, and later put back to jail pending trial for refusing to cooperate with the court and to comply with the conditions of her release. In January 2023, she was found guilty on all counts of misdemeanor and of the felony of obstructing an official proceeding. Bauer's co-defendant, who had pleaded guilty to a misdemeanor, was sentenced to probation and to a $500 fine. 

In 2022, rapper 42 Dugg, facing a six-month prison sentence on a gun-related charge, filed a document in federal court in which he claimed to be a sovereign citizen to whom federal law did not apply. He was arrested and incarcerated.

In 2022, Darrell Brooks, the perpetrator of the Waukesha Christmas parade attack, proclaimed himself a sovereign citizen as part of his pro se defense. In the course of his trial, he kept disrupting the proceedings and raising arguments based on sovereign citizen ideology. Judge Dorow ruled that Brooks was not allowed to argue to be a sovereign citizen in court, stating that the defense was without merit; she commented that sovereign citizen legal theories were "nonsense" and that the movement's tactics had no place in the judicial system. Brooks was found guilty on all counts and sentenced to life without the possibility of parole.

Similar groups outside the United States 
There is some cross-over between the two groups calling themselves Freemen and Sovereign Citizens, as well as various others sharing similar beliefs, which may be loosely defined as "see[ing] the state as a corporation with no authority over free citizens".

English-speaking countries

With the advent of the Internet and continuing during the 21st century, people throughout the Anglosphere who share the core beliefs of these movements have been able to connect and share their ideas. While arguments specific to the history and laws of the United States are not used (except inadvertently, by litigants who use poorly adapted U.S. material), many concepts have been incorporated or adopted by individuals and groups in English-speaking Commonwealth countries. In Canada, which has its own tradition of tax protesters, fiscal misconceptions of American origin were gradually introduced during the 1980s and 1990s.

Around 1999-2000, sovereign citizen and redemption concepts were introduced into Canada by Eldon Warman, who adapted them to a Commonwealth context. These ideas were further adapted in Canada by the freeman on the land movement, which espouses an ideology broadly similar to that of the sovereign citizen movement, but is aimed at a less conservative audience. Canadian-style freeman of the land ideas were later imported into other Commonwealth countries, but American-style sovereign citizen ideology has also reached these regions of the world.

As of the 2010s, there are people identifying as sovereign citizens in Canada, Australia, New Zealand, the United Kingdom, the Republic of Ireland and South Africa. Sovereign Citizens from the U.S. have gone on speaking tours to New Zealand and Australia, appealing to struggling farmers, and there are Internet presences in both countries.

Canada
Whilst the more Canada-specific freeman on the land movement has declined since the early 2010s, the Canadian sovereign citizen movement has gained traction during the same period. Canada had an estimated 30,000 sovereign citizens in 2015, many associating with the freeman on the land movement as well. There can be confusion between the two populations.

Legal scholar Donald J. Netolitzky makes a distinction between the Canadian sovereign citizen and freeman on the land movements, in that freemen on the land, while ideologically heterogenous, tend to be politically more left leaning than sovereign citizens.

The 2012 Meads v. Meads ruling examined almost 150 cases involving pseudolaw and sovereign citizen or freeman of the land tactics, grouping them and characterizing them as "Organized Pseudolegal Commercial Arguments".

Australia

Australia, which has its own tradition of pseudolaw, imported sovereign citizen ideas in the 1990s, even before the movement's 2000s resurgence. It later imported the more Commonwealth-specific freeman on the land movement. There is some cross-over between Australian freemen on the land, local sovereign citizens groups, and some others. The core concept has been tested by several court cases, none successful for the "freemen". In 2011, climate denier and political activist Malcolm Roberts (later elected senator for Pauline Hanson's One Nation party), wrote a letter to then Prime Minister Julia Gillard filled with characteristic sovereign citizen ideas and vocabulary, although he denied that he was a "sovereign citizen".

From the 2010s, there has been a growing number of freemen targeting Indigenous Australians, with groups using names like Tribal Sovereign Parliament of Gondwana Land, the Original Sovereign Tribal Federation (OSTF) and the Original Sovereign Confederation. OSTF Founder Mark McMurtrie, an Aboriginal Australian man, has produced YouTube videos speaking about "common law", which incorporate freemen beliefs. Appealing to other Aboriginal people by partly identifying with the land rights movement, McMurtrie played on their feelings of alienation and lack of trust in the systems which had not served Indigenous people well.

In 2015, the New South Wales Police Force identified "sovereign citizens" as a potential terrorist threat, estimating that there were about 300 sovereign citizens in the state at the time. Freemen/Sovereign Citizen ideas have been promoted on the Internet by various Australian groups such as "United Rights Australia" (U R Australia).

The COVID-19 pandemic in Australia has accelerated the spread of the movement; numerous incidents with law enforcement have since been reported in Australia, some of them violent such as the 2022 Wieambilla shootings.

United Kingdom
Sovereign citizen ideology reached the United Kingdom around 2010. British sovereign citizens have helped spread COVID vaccine misinformation as well as various conspiracy theories – including 9/11 theories and one about the Queen having been replaced by a satanic cabal – and tried to set up their own cryptocurrency. The Common Law Court website, one of the main UK sovereign citizen resources, has for a time supported an impostor who claimed to be the rightful heir to the British throne.

Austria and Germany 

Groups with similar beliefs and behaviors are found in Austria and Germany. The Reichsbürger movement (Reich citizen movement) in Germany originated around 1985 and had approximately 19,000 members in 2019, more concentrated in the south and east. The originator claimed to have been appointed head of the post-World War I Reich, but other leaders claim imperial authority. The movement consists of different, usually small groups. Some groups have issued passports and identification cards. The Reichsbürger movement claims that modern day Germany is not a sovereign state but a corporation created by Allied nations after World War II. They also expressed their hope that Donald Trump would lead an army to restore the Reich. According to the German domestic intelligence service, only a small number of groups in the Reich citizen movement fall into the far-right spectrum. Rather, the common denominator is the rejection of the Federal Republic as a legal entity. The Reichsbürger movement has used language and techniques from the One People's Public Trust, an American sovereign citizen group operated by "guru" Heather Ann Tucci-Jarraf. On December 7, 2022, 25 people connected to the Reichsbürger movement were arrested in a nationwide raid by German police forces, for their involvement in a suspected terrorist plot against the German government and institutions.

In Austria, the group  (Austrian Commonwealth), in addition to issuing its own passports and licence plates, had a written constitution. The group, established in November 2015, also used language from the One People's Public Trust. In 2019, its leader was sentenced to 14 years in jail after trying to order the Austrian Armed Forces to overthrow the government and requesting foreign assistance from Vladimir Putin; other members received lesser sentences.

Italy
As of the 2010s, incidents involving sovereign citizens have been reported in Italy, with various people purporting to opt out of Italian citizenship through nonlegal procedures and make themselves immune from Italian law. Members of one group attempt to do so by declaring themselves citizens of the "Sovereign Kingdom of Gaia" ("Regno Sovrano di Gaia") while others refer to themselves as the "People of Mother Earth" ("Popolo della Terra Madre").

Russia

A Russian movement of conspiracy theorists, known among other names as the Union of Slavic Forces of Russia (Soyuz slavyanskikh sil Rusi), or more informally as "Soviet Citizens", holds that the Soviet Union still exists de jure and that the current Russian government and legislation are thus illegitimate. One of its beliefs is that the government of the Russian Federation is an offshore company through which the United States illegally controls the country.

France and Belgium 
In 2021, a New Age-oriented French group of conspiracy theorists called "One Nation" became known to the public for their involvement in the kidnapping of a child. Later that year, they attempted to purchase a property in the rural department of Lot, purportedly to create a "center for the arts" and a "research laboratory". The One Nation movement holds beliefs similar to those of American sovereign citizens and denies the legitimacy of the French State. They also share beliefs with QAnon. People affiliated with One Nation are also active in Belgium. In February 2022, the group's French spokeswoman was sentenced to six months in prison for multiple traffic violations. She was arrested and incarcerated in September of the same year.

See also

Violent incidents

 
 1995 Oklahoma City bombing
 2003 standoff in Abbeville, South Carolina
 2009 assassination of George Tiller
 2010 West Memphis police shootings
 2014 Bundy standoff
 2016 occupation of the Malheur National Wildlife Refuge
 2016 shooting of Baton Rouge police officers
 2016 shooting of Korryn Gaines
 2018 Nashville Waffle House shooting
 2021 Wakefield, Massachusetts standoff
 2021 Waukesha Christmas parade attack
 2022 Wieambilla police shootings

Groups

 American militia movement
 Christian Patriot movement
 Citizens for Constitutional Freedom
 Embassy of Heaven
 Kingdom Filipina Hacienda
 Guardians of the Free Republics
 Montana Freemen
 Moorish Sovereign Citizens
 Patriot movement
 Posse Comitatus movement
 Sitcomm Arbitration Association
 Swissindo
 Washitaw Nation

Individuals

 Edward and Elaine Brown
 Schaeffer Cox
Romana Didulo 
 William Potter Gale
 John Joe Gray
 Richard Marple 
 David Wynn Miller
 Sean David Morton
 Terry Nichols
 Gavin Seim
 Glenn Unger

Concepts

 Anarcho-capitalism
 Anarchism and nationalism
 Anomie
 Anti-Federalism
 Antinomianism
 Antisemitism in the United States
 Anti-statism
 Christian Identity
 Consent of the governed
 Constitutionalism in the United States
 Debt evasion
 Declarationism
 Eumeswil
 Individualist anarchism
 National-anarchism
 Paleoconservatism
 Paleolibertarianism
 Radical right (United States)
 Right-libertarianism
 Self-ownership
 Social contract
 Statelessness
 Strawman theory
 Tax resistance in the United States
 White supremacy

References

Further reading

External links 

 "A quick guide to Sovereign Citizens" (UNC School of Government)
 "Common Law and Uncommon Courts: An Overview of the Common Law Court Movement", Mark Pitcavage, The Militia Watchdog Archives, Anti-Defamation League, July 25, 1997.
 The Sovereigns: A Dictionary of the Peculiar, Southern Poverty Law Center, August 1, 2010
 What cops need to know about sovereign citizen encounters (PoliceOne)
 FBI page on the Sovereign Citizen movement
 Sovereign Citizens: A Clear and Present Danger (Police magazine)
 Sovereign Citizen Movement – Anti-Defamation League
 Sovereign Citizen Movement Southern Poverty Law Center (SPLC)
 SPLC's Video Informing Law Enforcement on the Dangers of "Sovereign Citizens"
 Without Prejudice: What Sovereign Citizens Believe, J.M. Berger, GWU Program on Extremism, June 2016

 
Anti-Federalism
Libertarianism in the United States
QAnon
Terrorism in the United States
Far-right politics in the United States
Crime in the United States
Antisemitism in the United States